BigBasket is a large online grocer headquartered in Bangalore, India, and currently owned by Tata Group. Its registered company name is Supermarket Grocery Supplies Pvt.

, the company operates in more than 30 cities in India and processes around 15 million orders per month.

According to Bloomberg News, BigBasket is considering an initial public offering by 2025 as part of its growth plans.

History 

BigBasket began as a tech startup company, founded in October 2011 by five entrepreneurs who had survived the dot-com crash of the early 2000's. The startup was initially funded by private equity investor Ascent Capital (Bangalore) with a capital injection of $10 million. 

By mid-2016, Bigbasket was operating in eight large Indian cities and had grown to become India's biggest e-grocer. The company's unique selling point was delivery of fresh produce, based on the purchase of fruit and vegetables from local marketplaces each morning, storage in refrigerated warehouses and a fleet of temperature-controlled trucks to deliver fresh to the door.

China's Alibaba Group led a $300 million funding round in early 2018 to become the main shareholder in the company, taking the online grocer's valuation up to $950 million. By May 2019, BigBasket was operating across 25 Indian cities, and became India's newest 'unicorn' (a startup valued at more than $1 billion) by raising $150 million in a new funding round led by Mirae Asset-Naver Asia Growth Fund, the CDC Group and Alibaba.

The company was valued at around $1.85 billion in May 2021. Demand for online grocery shopping increased considerably in the wake of the COVID-19 pandemic and by the start of 2022, BigBasket was processing over 7 million orders per month.

Tata Group became the owner of BigBasket in May 2021 when its Tata Digital subsidiary acquired a 64% majority stake in the company. In January 2023, BigBasket received a $200 million injection from investors, including majority shareholder Tata Digital, taking the company valuation up to $3.2 billion.

Products
BigBasket offers tens of thousands of different products, including fruits and vegetables, meats, spices, toiletries, baby products and pet food. According to CEO Vipul Parekh, over one-third of the company's revenue comes from its private label products.

Offline retail
On 24 November 2021, BigBasket opened its first physical store, branded 'Fresho', primarily for the sale of fresh fruit and vegetables. Located in Bangalore, this was the first of many planned Fresho stores.

See also
List of online grocers
E-commerce in India

References

External links
Online companies of India
Online food ordering
Online grocers
Online marketplaces of India
Indian companies established in 2011
Retail companies established in 2011